"Sun Goddess" is a smooth soul song by jazz musician Ramsey Lewis featuring the band Earth, Wind & Fire issued as a single in 1975 on Columbia Records. The song rose to No. 20 on the Billboard Hot Soul Songs chart.

Overview
"Sun Goddess" was produced by Maurice White and composed by White together with Jon Lind. The song appears on Ramsey Lewis' 1974 album of the same name.

Chart positions

References

1975 singles
Ramsey Lewis songs
Songs written by Jon Lind
Songs written by Maurice White
Smooth jazz songs
1975 songs
Columbia Records singles